The Brabantsche Yeesten (or   Gestes de Brabant) is a rhyming chronicle of some 46,000 verses written in the 14th and 15th centuries in the Middle Dutch language. It provides a history of the Duchy of Brabant, and the original five volumes were written by 
Jan van Boendale (c. 1280–c. 1351) of Antwerp; his text was later extended to seven volumes.

Van Boendale's text was written between around 1318 and around 1350, commissioned for a member of the Antwerp patriciate. It extends to 16,318 verses. Boendale's main sources were the Chronica de origine ducum Brabantiae of 1294 and Spieghel Historiael  of Jacob van Maerlant. Much of the text of the first three books are taken from van Maerlant almost verbatim. The events in book five are from Boendale's own lifetime.

Books six and seven, which extend the scope of the chronicled events to 1440, were written by Wein van Cotthem. Book six is dated 1432 and book seven is dated 1440; this latter date is also the approximate age of the oldest extant manuscripts of the text. There are seven extant manuscript copies. Two 15th-century manuscripts are held by the Royal Library of Belgium in Brussels (mss. IV 684 and IV 685). The text was first edited by Jan Frans Willems and Jean Henri Bormans beginning in 1839.

Literature
 Jan Frans Willems: De Brabantsche Yeesten (3 vols., Brussels 1839, 1843, 1869). vol. 2 available online.
 Katell De Groote: Jan Van Boendaele, Brabantse Yeesten, XXIV. M.A. dissertation at the Katholieke Universiteit Leuven, 2003.

References

External links

http://bibliodyssey.blogspot.ch/2011/04/brabant-chronicle.html

14th century in the duchy of Brabant
Low Countries chronicles
14th-century books
15th-century books